The list contains songs written by Indian poet and songwriter Kannadasan. He won a National Film Award for Best Lyrics which is the first lyricist receive the award. His association with Viswanathan–Ramamoorthy is notable.

Awards

List of songs

1940s

1950s

1960s

1970s

1980s

References

External links

Lists of songs by songwriters
Indian filmographies